Platystomos albinus is a species of beetle in the family Anthribidae, the fungus weevils. Adults measure . The larvae feed on decaying trees, and are associated with the fungus Daldinia. It is present in deciduous forests throughout Europe and the Near East, including central southern and eastern Britain.

The species was described by Carl Linnaeus in his Systema Naturae.

References 

Anthribidae
Beetles described in 1758
Taxa named by Carl Linnaeus